Charles Finney Tambling (November 1, 1871 – May 6, 1958) was an American football, basketball, and baseball coach.  He served as the head football coach at Central Michigan Normal School—now known as Central Michigan University—from 1902 to 1905 and again in 1918.  Tambling coached was the head basketball coach at Central Michigan from 1904 to 1910 and again from 1917 to 1919.  He was the school's head baseball coach from 1901 to 1907.  Tambling was also the head of the physiology and physical training department at Central Michigan.  Tambling graduated from Oberlin College.  He moved to Redlands, California in 1937.  He resided there for ten years before moving to Cathedral City, California, where he died on May 6, 1958.

Head coaching record

Football

References

1873 births
1958 deaths
Basketball coaches from Ohio
Central Michigan Chippewas baseball coaches
Central Michigan Chippewas football coaches
Central Michigan Chippewas men's basketball coaches
Oberlin College alumni
People from Oberlin, Ohio
People from Cathedral City, California
People from Redlands, California